Juan Sebastián Cabal and Robert Farah were the defending champions and successfully defended their title, defeating Raven Klaasen and Michael Venus in the final, 6–1, 6–3.

Seeds

Draw

Finals

Top half

Bottom half

References
 Main Draw

Men's Doubles
Italian Open – Doubles